Monodelphis pinocchio, also known as the long-nosed short-tailed opossum (not to be mistaken with Monodelphis scalops) is a species of mammal in the family Didelphidae. It is native to southeastern Brazil.

Taxonomy 
The specific epithet refers to the fictional doll Pinocchio from The Adventures of Pinocchio, alluding to the enlarged rostrum of this opossum, which resembles Pinocchios's elongated nose.

Description 
It is a small species of opossum. It is uniformly brown all over its body, with a pale gray belly.

Distribution and habitat 
It is found in the Atlantic Forest of southeastern Brazil, in the states of São Paulo, Rio de Janeiro, Minas Gerais, and Esperito Santo. It is restricted to montane habitats.

References 

Mammals described in 2015